Qaa (Arabic: القاع), El Qaa, Al Qaa, Qaa Baalbek or Masharih al-Qaa is a town in Baalbek-Hermel Governorate, Lebanon.
It has a mainly Greek Catholic population.

The village has been the target of attacks from Syrian government and anti-government forces.

History
In 1838, Eli Smith noted Qaa's population as being predominantly  Catholic Christian.

On June 28, 1978, unidentified militiamen killed twenty-six villagers from Qaa and three other villages. The murders were believed to be connected to the killing of thirty-four people, including Tony Franjieh, on 13 June. The gunmen were reported to have had lists of names from which they selected their victims.

The Syrian army invaded Lebanon at 4 a.m. on 1 September 2012 and kidnapped a farmer from the town as part of escalating incursions during the Syrian civil war. The invasion lasted for forty minutes before the unit withdrew. A house in Qaa had previously been hit by a shell fired by the Syrian army.

On the 27 June 2016, at least five people in Qaa were killed and thirteen others wounded in an attack by four suicide bombers during the Syrian Civil war spillover into Lebanon.

Archaeology
Along with Maqne I, Qaa is a type site of the Shepherd Neolithic industry. It was discovered by M. Billaux and the materials recovered were documented by Henri Fleisch in 1966. The area was lightly cultivated with a thin soil covering the conglomerates. The flints were divided into three groups of a reddish brown, light brown and one that was mostly chocolate and grey colored with a radiant "desert shine".

Their second characteristic is the limited number of forms that the tools take, apart from cores being transverse racloirs on small flakes, strong-pointed borers, denticulated or notched thick, short blades and end-scrapers. It was thirdly characterized by a lack of known typology, with only occasional use of Levallois technique. It was determined to be definitely later than the Mesolithic but without any usual forms from the Upper Paleolithic or pottery Neolithic. Henri Fleisch tentatively suggested the industry to be Epipaleolithic and suggested it may have been used by nomadic shepherds. The Shepherd Neolithic has largely been ignored and understudied following the outbreak of the Lebanese civil war.

See also
Qaa massacre
Al-Qaa airstrike
2016 Qaa bombings

References

Bibliography

External links
 Qaa Baalbek,  Localiban 
Image of the landscape of Qaa including massive stone block
 

Populated places in Baalbek District
Great Rift Valley
Archaeological sites in Lebanon
Beqaa Valley
Shepherd Neolithic sites
Archaeological type sites
Melkite Christian communities in Lebanon